Abdul Rahim (7 June 1902 – 14 November 1977) was an Indian politician of the Indian National Congress. He served as a member of the Rajya Sabha from 3 April 1958, to 2 April 1962.

He was born in Madras, to Kazi Abdul Karim. He joined the Indian National Congress and served as a member of the Rajya Sabha from 1958 to 1962. He was also a prolific writer and had authored four books in Tamil.

Family 

Abdul Rahim married Bibijan. The couple had one son and two daughters.

References 

 

1902 births
1977 deaths
Indian National Congress politicians from Tamil Nadu